Peace on Earth is a Kitaro album of classic Christmas songs taken from cultures around the world. It was released by Domo Records in 1996 and reissued in 2011. The reissue includes a DVD of nature visuals synchronized to music from the album. Peace on Earth peaked at number 4 on the Billboard Top New Age Albums Chart in December 1996.

Track listing
All songs are traditional, except "The Great Spirit", which was composed by Kitaro.

Personnel
Kitaro : producer, lead synthesizers, Hammond organ, electric guitar, taiko, gong, beam
Annamaria Karacson : violin
Gyongyver Petheo : violin
Daniel Flick : viola
Kevin Johnson : cello
Kristen Stordahl Kanda : flute, music contracting
Pamela Eldridge : harp
Massito : guitar
Derek Zimmerman : percussion
Keith Heffner : keyboards
Gary Barlough : producer, engineer, synclavier and analog keyboards
International Peace Choir
David Holtom : vocal solo on "Little Drummer Boy"
Massito : guitar arrangement on "A La Nanita Nana"
Peter R. Kelsey : engineer
Steve Mixdorf : assistant engineer
Daijiro Miyazawa : assistant engineer
Doug Sax : mastering engineer
Gavin Lurssen : mastering engineer
Dino Malito : mastering engineer (re-issue)
Keith Heffner : arranger, conductor
Music contracting : Kristen Stordahl Kanda
Additional personnel
Eiichi Naito : executive producer, management
Dino Malito : artists & repertoire, management
Howard Sapper : business & legal affairs
Hitoshi Saito : marketing
Kio Griffith/ 9rpm.com : art direction and design (2012 version)
Art Slave : art direction and design (1995 version)
Uniphoto Picture Agency : front cover photography
Steve Burns : International Peace Choir photography

Charts

References

External links
Kitaro official web page 
Kitaro official web page 
Kitaro TV - Kitaro's official YouTube Page

1996 Christmas albums
Christmas albums by Japanese artists
Kitarō albums
New-age Christmas albums